Catherine Horwood is an English journalist, author and social historian who writes extensively on horticulture, garden design, and in fashion, the history of dress. She is the authorised biographer of the British plantswoman, garden designer, and author, Beth Chatto (best known for creating the Beth Chatto Gardens near Elmstead, Essex and described as ‘one of the most influential horticulturalists for the last 50 years’). Her biography, Beth Chatto: a life with plants won the European Garden Book of the Year award in 2020.

Horwood has contributed to the Oxford Dictionary of National Biography and to BBC Radio 4 programmes on social history.

She is married to emeritus Professor Patrick Barwise.

Journalism
Horwood has written for English Garden, Gardens Illustrated and Good Housekeeping magazine, becoming Good Housekeeping'''s features editor.

Academic career
Horwood completed a Master of Arts (MA) degree in Women's History, and a PhD on Interwar Middle Class dress codes at Royal Holloway, University of London. She was also an Honorary Research Fellow at University of London and has also been awarded fellowships at the Yale Center for British Art, and the Huntington Library, Art and Botanical Gardens at San Marino, CA.

Author
Horwood is the author of six books on horticulture, garden design and the social history of women in horticulture, and two books on fashion history.

Horticulture

 Potted History. How Houseplants Took Over Our Homes - (Pimpernel Press, 2020)Beth Chatto: A life with plants - (Pimpernel Press, 2019)Rose - (Reaktion, 2018)Amazon Books: Catherine Horwood: ‘Rose’
Women and Their Gardens: A History from the Elizabethan Era to Today - (Chicago Review Press, 2012)Amazon Books: Catherine Horwood: ‘Women and Their Gardens: A History from the Elizabethan Era to Today’
Gardening Women: Their Stories From 1600 to the Present - (Virago, 2010)Potted History: The Story of Plants in the Home - (Frances Lincoln Publishers, 2007)Dress
 Keeping Up Appearances: Fashion and Class Between the Wars - (The History Press, 2011)Amazon Books: Catherine Horwood: ‘Keeping Up Appearances: Fashion and Class Between the Wars’
 Worst Fashions: What We Shouldn't Have Worn. But Did - (Sutton, 2005)References

External links
 Catherine Horwood 
 Amazon Books Biography 
 Telegraph'' interview 
 Gardening Women 

Living people
British writers
English journalists
English writers
English biographers
Year of birth missing (living people)